The 2001 CART PPG/Dayton Indy Lights Championship Powered By Buick consisted of 12 races. It was dominated by Townsend Bell who captured six victories on his way to the championship. It was the last Indy Lights season, as the series organizer, CART, decided to drop the Indy Lights series and concentrate its efforts on the Toyota Atlantic Championship. Most former Indy Lights teams that wished to stay in business went either to the Atlantic series, which replaced Indy Lights as the support race at most CART events, or the new Infiniti Pro Series, which ran in support of Indy Racing League events.

Drivers and teams
All teams utilized Lola T97/20 chassis with Buick V6 engines.

Calendar

Race summaries

Monterrey
March 11, 2001
Fundidora Park, Monterrey, Mexico
Pole position: Derek Higgins, 1:25.345,

Long Beach
April 8, 2001
Long Beach street circuit, Long Beach, California
Pole position: Mario Domínguez, 1:15.968,

Texas
April 28, 2001
Texas Motor Speedway, Fort Worth, Texas
Pole position: Damien Faulkner, 0:29:060, 
The CART race that weekend was cancelled due to track incompatibility, so this was the only race completed that weekend.

Milwaukee
June 3, 2001
Milwaukee Mile, West Allis, Wisconsin
Pole position: Townsend Bell (qualifying rained out; grid determined by championship points)

Portland
June 24, 2001
Portland International Raceway, Portland, Oregon
Pole position: Townsend Bell, 1:04.991,

Kansas
July 8, 2001
Kansas Speedway, Kansas City, Kansas
Pole position: Mario Domínguez, 0:30.252, 

‡Townsend Bell was penalized two positions for aggressive driving.

Toronto
July 15, 2001
Exhibition Place, Toronto, Ontario
Pole position: Townsend Bell, 1:04.202,

Mid-Ohio
August 12, 2001
Mid-Ohio Sports Car Course, Lexington, Ohio
Pole position: Townsend Bell, 1:13.809,

Gateway
August 26, 2001
Gateway International Raceway, Madison, Illinois
Pole position: Townsend Bell (qualifying rained out; grid determined by championship points)

Road Atlanta
October 5, 2001
Road Atlanta, Braselton, Georgia
Pole position: Townsend Bell, 1:14.883,

Laguna Seca
October 14, 2001
Mazda Raceway Laguna Seca, Monterey, California
Pole position: Townsend Bell, 1:16.313,

Fontana
November 4, 2001
California Speedway, Fontana, California
Pole position: Townsend Bell (qualifying rained out; grid determined by championship points)
This was the last CART-sanctioned Indy Lights race.

Final points standings

Note:
Race 4 no additional point for the qualifying was awarded due to rain, starting grid were determined by championship points standing.
Race 9 no additional point for the qualifying was awarded due to rain, starting grid were determined by championship points standing.

Complete Overview

R9=retired, but classified NS=did not start

See also
2001 CART season
2001 Formula Atlantic season

References

External links
2001 season data from Motorsport.com

Indy Lights seasons
Indy Lights
Indy Lights